Isabelle Nef, née Lander (27 September 1895 – 2 January 1976) was a Swiss pianist and harpsichordist, as well as a professor at the Conservatoire de musique de Genève.

Life 
Born in Geneva, Nef studied the piano at the conservatoire de Genève with Marie Panthès then, in Paris, composition with Vincent d'Indy and harpsichord with Wanda Landowska.

She had a concert career in Europe, South America and North America including Seattle, New York and Washington in USSR, and South Africa and in Australia.

In 1936 she became the first harpsichord teacher at the Conservatoire de Genève. She then became an honorary professor and remained there until 1975 when she retired at the age of 80. She died in Collex-Bossy. She was succeeded by harpsichordist Christiane Jaccottet.

A path was given her name in Collex-Bossy.

References

External links 
 Baker’s Biographical Dictionary of 20th Century Classical Musicians on WorldCat, 1997
 

Swiss harpsichordists
Swiss classical pianists
20th-century classical pianists
Women classical pianists
1895 births
1976 deaths
Musicians from Geneva